Hughes High School (HHS) was an accredited comprehensive public middle and high school located in Hughes, Arkansas, a part of the Hughes School District, until its entire school district was closed due to declining enrollment in 2015. The Hughes High School mascot for academic and athletic teams was the Blue Devil with royal blue and white serving as the school colors.

As the only high school of its district, it served the following places in St. Francis and Crittenden counties: Hughes, Horseshoe Lake, and the St. Francis County section of Jennette.

History 

The Hughes School District was closed due to declining enrollment in 2015. The students were consolidated with the West Memphis School District.

Most middle school-aged students moved to West Junior High School, and most high school students were moved to Academies of West Memphis (formerly West Memphis High School). The West Memphis district took possession of the school buildings, then gave them to the Hughes municipal government in 2016. The high school gymnasium was leased at no cost to the chief of police and Hughes High alumnus Deon Lee, who made it into an after school center, spending about $3,000 on cleanup.

Notable people 

Gus Malzahn, head football coach from 1992 to 1994
Mark R. Martin (1986), Secretary of State of Arkansas since 2011; member of the Arkansas House of Representatives from Washington County from 2005 to 2011; resident of Prairie Grove in Washington County<ref></ref

References 

 

Public high schools in Arkansas
Public middle schools in Arkansas
Schools in St. Francis County, Arkansas
2015 disestablishments in Arkansas
Educational institutions disestablished in 2015